Lerdo (Spanish for "Dull") is an unincorporated community in Kern County, California.

A post office operated at Lerdo from 1890 to 1894.

References

Unincorporated communities in Kern County, California
Unincorporated communities in California